The Cabinet of Yemen refers to the governing body of the internationally recognized Yemen government led by the Chairman of the Presidential Leadership Council Rashad al-Alimi who replaced former President of Yemen Abdrabbuh Mansur Hadi on 7 April 2022 as the new President of Yemen. He then selected new cabinet members of the Yemeni Government.

As part of the 2015 Yemeni Civil War, the cabinet authority is contested by the Houthis, who took over the capital Sanaa in an armed rebellion against the government and formed the Supreme Revolutionary Committee and Supreme Political Council in 2015. President Hadi then declared Aden as the temporary capital. The United Nation Security Council resolution 2201 deplored the unilateral action of the Houthis while resolution 2216 reaffirmed the legitimacy of Hadi as the president of Yemen.

History
In 2012, after Saleh stepped down as a result of the Yemeni Revolution, part of the wider Arab Spring protests, in a political transition plan backed by Gulf states, Abd-Rabbu Mansour Hadi became the interim president and oversaw a national dialogue to draft a more inclusive, federal constitution. In 2014 the Houthis rapidly advanced south from Saada and seize Sanaa on 21 September with help from Saleh. In 2015, Hadi tried to announce a new federal constitution. The Houthis, who opposed the constitution, arrested him and forced him to resign. He escaped to Aden and declared it as the interim capital. He also asked the international community to intervene, triggering the Saudi led Arab military coalition intervention.

Current Cabinet

See also
Yemeni Revolution
Supreme Political Council

References

External links
Cabinet, Republic of Yemen 
Cabinet of Yemen 
Yemen from the CIA list of Chiefs of State and Cabinet Members

Yemen, Cabinet
Government of Yemen
Politics of Yemen
Yemeni Crisis (2011–present)